The Peshawar Brigade was an infantry brigade formation of the Indian Army during World War II. It was formed in December 1907, for service on the North West Frontier. During World War II it was normal practice for newly formed battalions to be posted to the North West Frontier for service before being sent to Africa, Burma or Italy.

Formation
These units served in the brigade during World War II
1st King's Regiment
16th Light Cavalry
2/19th Hyderabad Regiment
24th Mountain Regiment, Indian Artillery
3/6th Rajputana Rifles
4/8th Punjab Regiment
4/14th Punjab Regiment
5/10th Baluch Regiment
5/12th Frontier Force Regiment
2/11th Sikh Regiment
4/17th Dogra Regiment
Kalibahadur Regiment, Nepal
5/5th Mahratta Light Infantry
2/2nd Punjab Regiment
11/18th Royal Garhwal Rifles
4/18th Royal Garhwal Rifles
4/15th Punjab Regiment
7/12th Frontier Force Regiment
6/18th Royal Garhwal Rifles
2nd Duke of Wellington's Regiment
26th Mountain Regiment IA	
9/1st Punjab Regiment
8/11th Sikh Regiment
7/17th Dogra Regiment
1st Queen's Royal Regiment
4th Jammu and Kashmir Infantry
16/5th Mahratta Light Infantry
6/19th Hyderabad Regiment
6/18th Royal Garhwal Rifles
6/7th Rajput Regiment
14/9th Jat Regiment
7th York and Lancaster Regiment
20 Mountain Regiment IA	
5/8th Punjab Regiment
5/15th Punjab Regiment
6/6th Rajputana Rifles
2nd Green Howards
2nd Patiala Infantry
1st Somerset Light Infantry
6/8th Punjab Regiment
8/2nd Punjab Regiment
29th Mountain Regiment IA	
5/4th Bombay Grenadiers
5/16th Punjab Regiment
18/5th Mahratta Light Infantry
9/19th Hyderabad Regiment
1st Field Company Indian Engineers
8th Anti-Aircraft Battery Royal Artillery
18th Mountain Battery IA	
19th Medium Battery RA
62nd Field Company IE

See also

 List of Indian Army Brigades in World War II

References

British Indian Army brigades